Ronnes is a Dutch surname. Notable people with the surname include:

 Bram Ronnes (born 1978), Dutch beach volleyball player
 Erik Ronnes (born 1967), Dutch politician
 Frans Ronnes (born 1948), Dutch politician
 Gijs Ronnes (born 1977), Dutch beach volleyball player

Dutch-language surnames